Rebecca "Spida" Allen (born 6 November 1992) is an Australian basketball player for the Connecticut Sun of the Women's National Basketball Association (WNBA).

Allen was a member of the Australian Women's basketball team (Opals) at the 2020 Tokyo Olympics. The Opals were eliminated after losing to the USA in the quarterfinals.

Early years 
Allen was born and bred in Melbourne, Australia. She played in the junior competition for the suburb Nunawading. Allen has twin brother, Christopher. Allen was given the nickname "Spida" because of her long limbs. She was sought out by the Women's National Basketball League (WNBL) at the age of 16.

Career

WNBL
In the domestic Women's National Basketball League (WNBL), Allen has played for the Dandenong Rangers (2009–2010), Australian Institute of Sport (2010–2012), Melbourne Boomers (2012–2015) and South East Queensland Stars (2015–2016). In 2014, Allen was awarded the WNBL Robyn Maher Defensive Player of the Year.

Alongside the WNBL, in Australia Allen played with the Knox Raiders for the 2013 SEABL Season where the team took home the Championship. Allen starred and was awarded the Barbara Barton (Grand Final MVP) medal. She was previously awarded the 2011 SEABL Youth Player of the Year.

WNBA
After her success at the World Championship, where she won a bronze medal, Allen signed as a free agent with the New York Liberty for the 2015 WNBA season. She made her WNBA debut in the Liberty’s 2015 season opener against Atlanta, scoring six points. Shortly into the 2015 season, Allen suffered a season-ending right knee cartilage injury and decided to return home to Australia to undergo surgery.

Allen was traded to the Connecticut Sun in January 2023, as part of a three-team deal.

LIGA FEMENINA ENDESA
In 2020, after the pandemic, she signed with the Spanish team, Valencia Basket.

National Team

Youth Level
Allen made her debut for the Gems at the 2011 FIBA Under-19 World Championship for Women held in Chile. Her long arms and legs earned her the nickname "Spida".

Senior Level
Allen is a current member of the Australian Women's basketball squad. Following good form in preliminary lead-up games, Allen was selected to represent the Opals at the 2014 World Championship held in Turkey where she would make her national team debut.

In 2019, Allen was named to the final roster for the 2019 FIBA Asia Cup. After strong showings throughout this tournament, Allen was named to the tournament All-Star Five.

Allen, like all the other members of the 2020 Tokyo Olympics Opals women's basketball team, had a difficult tournament. The Opals lost their first two group stage matches. They looked flat against Belgium and then lost to China in heartbreaking circumstances. In their last group match the Opals needed to beat Puerto Rico by 25 or more in their final match to progress. This they did by 27 in a very exciting match. However, they lost to the United States in their quarterfinal 79 to 55.

Career statistics

WNBA

Regular season

|-
| align="left" | 2015
| align="left" | New York
| 2 || 0 || 17.0 || .300 || .000 || .000 || 4.5 || 0.0 || 1.5 || 1.0 || 1.5 || 3.0
|-
| align="left" | 2016
| align="left" | New York
| 21 || 6 || 13.3 || .459 || .567 || .867 || 1.7 || 0.5 || 0.4 || 0.5 || 0.6 || 5.7
|-
| align="left" | 2017
| align="left" | New York
| 33 || 0 || 9.2 || .376 || .341 || .333 || 2.0 || 0.5 || 0.3 || 0.3 || 0.5 || 2.8
|-
| align="left" | 2018
| align="left" | New York
| 28 || 0 || 10.4 || .376 || .263 || .840 || 1.7 || 0.3 || 0.3 || 0.3 || 0.5 || 3.8
|-
| align="left" | 2019
| align="left" | New York
| 24 || 2 || 17.2 || .417 || .426 || .813 || 2.5 || 0.7 || 0.5 || 0.7 || 0.7 || 7.2
|-
| align="left" | 2021
| align="left" | New York
| 25 || 13 || 24.6 || .343 || .381 || .892 || 3.7 || 1.1 || 1.6 || 1.2 || 0.8 || 9.2
|-
| align="left" | 2022
| align="left" | New York
| 25 || 19 || 20.9 || .379 || .313 || .833 || 3.4 || 1.2 || 0.8 || 1.0 || 1.0 || 7.0
|-
| align="left" | Career
| align="left" | 7 years, 1 team
| 158 || 40 || 15.6 || .384 || .369 || .829 || 2.5 || 0.7 || 0.7 || 0.7 || 0.7 || 5.7
|}

Playoffs

|-
| align="left" | 2017
| align="left" | New York
| 1 || 0 || 6.7 || 1.000 || 1.000 || .000 || 0.0 || 0.0 || 0.0 || 1.0 || 0.0 || 3.0
|-
| align="left" | 2021
| align="left" | New York
| 1 || 1 || 29.0 || .500 || .600 || .000 || 4.0 || 0.0 || 1.0 || 3.0 || 0.0 || 11.0
|-
| align="left" | 2022
| align="left" | New York
| 3 || 0 || 16.3 || .286 || .167 || 1.000 || 3.0 || 1.3 || 0.7 || 0.3 || 1.0 || 4.3
|-
| align="left" | Career
| align="left" | 3 years, 1 team
| 5 || 1 || 17.0 || .391 || .417 || 1.000 || 2.6 || 0.8 || 0.6 || 1.0 || 0.6 || 5.4
|}

See also
List of Australian WNBA players

References

External links
Rebecca Allen Inteview at Nostresport.com. Retrieved 6 February 2023

1992 births
Living people
Australian expatriate basketball people in France
Australian expatriate basketball people in the United States
Australian Institute of Sport basketball (WNBL) players
Australian women's basketball players
Basketball players at the 2020 Summer Olympics
Dandenong Rangers players
Forwards (basketball)
Melbourne Boomers players
New York Liberty players
Olympic basketball players of Australia
People educated at Carey Baptist Grammar School
People from Wangaratta
South East Queensland Stars players
Sportswomen from Victoria (Australia)
Undrafted Women's National Basketball Association players